Timothy James Rice-Oxley (born 2 June 1976) is an English musician, best known for being the keyboardist, backing vocalist and songwriter of the alternative rock band Keane. In 2010, he formed a side-project, Mt. Desolation, with his Keane bandmate Jesse Quin.

Life and career 

Timothy James Rice-Oxley was born in Oxford to Charles Patrick and Margaret Rice-Oxley. He has a younger brother, Tom, born in 1979. He had piano lessons when he was a teenager but admitted to hating them and never practising pieces because they were all classical music, which he found boring. After his parents stopped his lessons, Rice-Oxley developed a liking for piano and so taught himself how to play, mainly because of the Beatles.

Keane 
Rice-Oxley provides live and studio backing vocals for Keane, except for the studio songs "Sunshine", "This Is the Last Time" (demo version) and "Your Love" where he sings the lead vocals, as well as some Under the Iron Sea DVD and Perfect Symmetry demos.

Compositions 
In 2006, Rice-Oxley co-wrote the songs "Early Winter", and "The Girl Inside" (unreleased) on Gwen Stefani's second solo album, The Sweet Escape. "Early Winter" has been performed by Keane live. The song "Perfect Symmetry" from the album of the same name is considered by Chaplin to be one of the best Rice-Oxley has written. In 2009, he co-wrote the song "Everything Is Beautiful" for Kylie Minogue's eleventh studio album, Aphrodite.

Rice-Oxley composed all the songs for the side-project Mt. Desolation with Jesse Quin in 2010. That same year Rice-Oxley provided the main vocal in Keane for the first time on the song "Your Love", which appeared on the experimental EP Night Train. He sang the song live. In 2013, he co-wrote the song "Jump" with Gary Barlow for the latter's solo album, Since I Saw You Last.

In 2016 he co-wrote the song "Magnificent Time" by Travis.

Mt. Desolation 
Mt. Desolation is an alt-country side-project that Rice-Oxley formed with bassist Jesse Quin. The band also consists of members of Mumford & Sons, The Killers and The Staves. Mt. Desolation released their self-titled debut album on 18 October 2010. The band toured the UK and Ireland in September 2010 and the US and Canada in October 2010.

The band's second album, When the Night Calls, was released on 25 May 2018. It was followed by a short tour of the UK in June 2018.

Personal life 
Rice-Oxley lives in Polegate, East Sussex. He has two daughters, Lilac and Anna.

Reportedly, the effects of touring took their toll on Rice-Oxley's marriage to Jayne, and they split up in 2012 after seven years of marriage.

Awards 

Rice-Oxley won an Ivor Novello Award for Songwriter of the Year in May 2005.

Discography

With Keane 

Studio albums
 Hopes and Fears (2004)
 Under the Iron Sea (2006)
 Perfect Symmetry (2008)
 Strangeland (2012)
 Cause and Effect (2019)

EPs
 Retrospective EP1 (2008)
 Night Train (2010)
 Retrospective EP2 (2010)
 Retroactive – EP1 (2019)
Compilations album
 The Best of Keane (2013)

With Mt. Desolation 
Studio albums
Mt. Desolation (2010)
When the Night Calls (2018)

References 

1976 births
Living people
21st-century British pianists
21st-century English bass guitarists
Alternative rock pianists
Alumni of University College London
British male pianists
English male guitarists
English male singer-songwriters
English rock keyboardists
English rock pianists
Ivor Novello Award winners
Keane (band) members
Male bass guitarists
Mt. Desolation members
Musicians from Kent
Musicians from Oxford
People educated at Tonbridge School
People from Battle, East Sussex
People from Polegate